This is a list of members of the Blue Dog Coalition.

The co-chairs of the Blue Dog Coalition for the 117th Congress were Ed Case (HI-01), Stephanie Murphy (FL-07), and Tom O'Halleran (AZ-01). The chair of the Blue Dog PAC, the Coalition's political organization, was then-Rep. Kurt Schrader. Rep. Murphy, a Vietnamese-American, was the first woman of color to lead the Blue Dog Coalition in its history.

As of March 2023, the caucus includes 8 members, and potentially an ninth.

Members for the 118th Congress

2022 elections

 Carolyn Bourdeaux (GA-07) - Lost re-nomination
 Jim Cooper (TN-05) - Retired 
 Charlie Crist (FL-13) - Ran for Governor & was defeated
 Stephanie Murphy (FL-07) - Retired
 Tom O'Halleran (AZ-02) - Defeated
 Kurt Schrader (OR-05) - Lost re-nomination

2020 elections 

 Anthony Brindisi (NY-22) - Defeated
 Joe Cunningham (SC-01) - Defeated
 Kendra Horn (OK-05) - Defeated
 Dan Lipinski (IL-3) - Lost renomination
 Ben McAdams (UT-4) - Defeated
 Collin Peterson (MN-07) - Defeated
 Max Rose (NY-11) - Defeated
 Xochitl Torres Small (NM-02) - Defeated

2018 elections
After the 2018 House of Representatives elections, the caucus grew from 18 members to 24 members, registering an increment in membership of little more than 33%. All incumbents seeking re-election won their races.

2016 elections
 Brad Ashford (NE-2) - Defeated
 Gwen Graham (FL-2) - Retired
 Loretta Sanchez (CA-46) - Ran for Senate & was defeated

2014 elections

 Ron Barber (AZ-2) - Defeated
 John Barrow (GA-12), Co-Chair for Administration - Defeated
 Pete Gallego (TX-23) - Defeated
 Jim Matheson (UT-4), Co-Chair for Communications - Retired
 Mike McIntyre (NC-7) - Retired
 Mike Michaud (ME-2) - Ran for Governor & was defeated
 Nick Rahall (WV-3) - Defeated

2012 elections

 Jason Altmire (PA-4) - Lost renomination
 Joe Baca  (CA-43) - Defeated
 Dan Boren (OK-2), Blue Dog Whip - Retired
 Tim Holden (PA-17) - Lost renomination
 Larry Kissell (NC-8) - Defeated	
 Leonard Boswell (IA-3) - Defeated
 Ben Chandler (KY-6) - Defeated
 Mike Ross (AR-4), Co-Chair for Communications - Retired
 Heath Shuler (NC-11), Co-Chair for Administration - Retired

Resigned during 112th Congress
 Dennis Cardoza (CA-18) - Resigned in 2012
 Gabrielle Giffords (AZ-8) - Resigned from the House in January 2012 to recover from injuries sustained in 2011 Tucson shooting
 Jane Harman (CA-36) - Resigned in 2011

2010 elections

Declined to seek re-election
 Robert Marion Berry (AR-1)
 Brad Ellsworth (IN-8) (ran for Senate in 2010 & was defeated)
 Bart Gordon (TN-6)
 Charlie Melancon (LA-3), Co-Chair for Communications (ran for Senate in 2010 & was defeated)
 Dennis Moore (KS-3)
 John Tanner (TN-8)

Defeated

 Mike Arcuri (NY-24)
 Melissa Bean (IL-8)
 Rick Boucher (VA-9)
 Allen Boyd (FL-2)
 Bobby Bright (AL-2) - Became a Republican in 2018
 Chris Carney (PA-10)
 Travis Childers (MS-1)
 Kathy Dahlkemper (PA-3)
 Lincoln Davis (TN-4)
 Chet Edwards (TX-17)
 Stephanie Herseth Sandlin (SD-AL), Blue Dog Co-Chair for Administration
 Baron Hill (IN-9), Blue Dog Co-Chair for Policy
 Frank Kratovil (MD-1)
 Betsy Markey (CO-4)
 Jim Marshall (GA-8)
 Walt Minnick (ID-1)
 Harry Mitchell (AZ-5)
 Patrick Murphy (PA-8)
 Scott Murphy (NY-20)
 Glenn Nye (VA-2)
 Earl Pomeroy (ND-AL)
 John Salazar (CO-3)
 Ike Skelton (MO-4)
 Zack Space (OH-18)
 Gene Taylor (MS-4) - Became a Republican in 2014
 Charlie Wilson (OH-6)

2008 elections
 Don Cazayoux (LA-6) - Defeated
 Bud Cramer (AL-5) - Retired
 Nick Lampson (TX-22) - Defeated
 Tim Mahoney (FL-16) - Defeated

2006 elections
 Harold Ford Jr. (TN-9) - Ran for Senate in 2006 & was defeated
 Ed Case (HI-2) - Ran for Senate in 2006 & defeated in primary

2004 elections

 Brad Carson (OK-2) - Ran for Senate in 2004 & was defeated
 Chris John (LA-7) - Ran for Senate in 2004 & was defeated
 Nick Lampson (TX-9) - Defeated following 2003 Texas redistricting
 Bill Lipinski (IL-3) - Retired
 Ken Lucas (KY-4) - Retired
 Max Sandlin (TX-1) - Defeated following 2003 Texas redistricting
 Charlie Stenholm (TX-17) - Defeated following 2003 Texas redistricting
 Jim Turner (TX-2) - Retired following 2003 Texas redistricting

2002 elections
 Gary Condit (CA-18) - Lost renomination
 David D. Phelps (IL-19) - Defeated following 2002 redistricting
 Ronnie Shows (MS-4) - Defeated following 2002 redistricting

2000 elections
 Owen Pickett (VA-2) - Retired
 Pat Danner (MO-6) - Retired
 David Minge (MN-2) - Defeated

1998 elections
 Scotty Baesler (KY-6) - Ran for Senate in 1998 & defeated

1996 elections
 Bill Orton (UT-3) - Defeated
 Glen Browder (AL-3) - Ran for Senate in 1996 & defeated in the primary
 Lewis F. Payne, Jr. (VA-5) - Ran for Lieutenant Governor of Virginia & was defeated
 Pete Geren (TX-12) - Retired
 Charlie Rose (NC-7) - Retired
 Bill Brewster (OK-3) - Retired

Appointed or elected to other offices

 Joe Donnelly (IN-2) - Elected to the Senate in 2012
 Kirsten Gillibrand (NY-20) - Appointed to the Senate in 2009 to replace Hillary Clinton
 Blanche Lincoln (AR-1) - Elected to the Senate in 1998
 Kyrsten Sinema (AZ-9) Elected to the Senate in 2018
 Ellen Tauscher (CA-10) - Appointed as Under Secretary of State for Arms Control and International Security Affairs in 2009

Died in office
 Norman Sisisky (VA-4) - Died in office in 2001

Left the Blue Dog Coalition
 Cheri Bustos (IL-17)
 Ed Case (HI-01)
 Lou Correa (CA-46)
 Steve Israel (NY-3)
 Adam Schiff (CA-29)
 Brad Schneider (IL-10)
 David Scott (GA-13)
 Mikie Sherrill (NJ-11)
 Abigail Spanberger (VA-07)
 Filemon Vela Jr. (TX-34)

Became Republicans

 Rodney Alexander (LA-5) - Became a Republican in 2004
 Nathan Deal (GA-9) - Became a Republican in 1995
 Ralph Hall (TX-4) - Became a Republican in 2004
 Jimmy Hayes (LA-7) - Became a Republican in 1995
 Virgil Goode (VA-5) - Became a Republican in 2002
 Parker Griffith (AL-5) - Became a Republican in 2009, returned to the Democrats in 2014
 Michael Parker (MS-4) - Became a Republican in 1995
 Billy Tauzin (LA-3) - Became a Republican in 1995
 Jeff Van Drew (NJ-2) - Became a Republican in 2019

Applied to join but was rejected
 Nancy Boyda (KS-2) - Unable to join in 2007

Notes

References

Ideological caucuses of the United States Congress
Centrism in the United States
Centrist political advocacy groups in the United States
Democratic Party (United States) organizations
Factions in the Democratic Party (United States)
Conservatism in the United States
Political terminology of the United States